Ramón Rojas  (c. 1979 – 20 September 2014) was a Chilean BASE jumper. On 21 August 2014, he broke the world record for the highest wingsuit ski base jump, when he made a  leap from Cerro El Plomo in the Andes. He died less than a month later while practicing in Lauterbrunnen, Switzerland at the age of 35.

References

2014 deaths
Chilean male divers
Sport deaths in Switzerland
BASE jumping deaths
1979 births